Hagen is the 41st-largest city in Germany. The municipality is located in the state of North Rhine-Westphalia. It is located on the south eastern edge of the Ruhr area, 15 km south of Dortmund, where the rivers Lenne and Volme (met by the river Ennepe) meet the river Ruhr. As of 31 December 2010, the population was 188,529.

The city is home to the FernUniversität Hagen (University of Hagen), which is the only state-funded distance education university in Germany. Counting 69,982 students (winter semester 2022/23), it is Germany's second-largest university.

History

Hagen was first mentioned around the year 1200, and is presumed to have been the name of a farm at the confluence of the Volme and the Ennepe rivers. In 1614 it was awarded to the Margraviate of Brandenburg, according to the Treaty of Xanten. In 1701 it became part of the Kingdom of Prussia.

After the defeat of Prussia in the Fourth Coalition, Hagen was incorporated into the Grand Duchy of Berg from 1807–13. In 1815 it became part of the new Prussian Province of Westphalia.

The city developed more rapidly in the 19th century, stimulated by industrialization: the mining of coal and the production of steel in the Ruhr Area. In reaction to the Kapp Putsch in March 1920, when rightists tried to overthrow the elected government and restore the monarchy, tens of thousands of leftist workers in the Ruhr Valley, Germany's most important industrial area, rose up in protest. They were known as the Red Ruhr Army.

 Thousands of workers went on strike and fought during the Ruhr Uprising, 13 March – 2 April 1920. Government and paramilitary forces were ordered against the workers, suppressing the uprising, and killing an estimated 1,000 workers. A memorial to the uprising was installed in Hagen.

By 1928, Hagen had developed into a city of more than 100,000 inhabitants.

During World War II, Hagen was bombed repeatedly, by both the Royal Air Force and the United States Eighth Air Force. On the night of 1 October 1943, 243 Lancasters and 8 Mosquitoes from the Royal Air Force's Bomber Command attacked the city. According to the Bomber Command Campaign Diary, "This raid was a complete success achieved on a completely cloud-covered target of small size, with only a moderate bomber effort and at trifling cost."  Hagen sustained severe damage from that raid, and hundreds of civilians were killed.

After World War II, the city was included in the new state of North Rhine-Westphalia in the Federal Republic of Germany (FRG, also known as West Germany).

Recent discoveries 
In August 2021, discovery of a cache of Nazi artifacts from a house was announced. A history teacher revealed a painted portrait of Adolf Hitler and medals decorated with eagles and swastikas, a newspaper from 1945, a pistol, gas masks, brass knuckles, and stacks of documents. It is also found out that the house once served as the headquarters of the Nationalsozialistische Volkswohlfahrt.

Economy
Owing to the extensive use of water power along the rivers Ruhr, Lenne, Volme and Ennepe, metal processing played an important role in the region of Hagen in and even before the 15th century.
In the 17th and 18th centuries, textile and steel industries, as well as paper production were developed here.

In the early 21st century, Hagen is the home of the Suedwestfaelische Industrie- und Handelskammer, as well as Sparkasse Hagen, the local public savings bank. The bank's former headquarters, the Sparkasse Hagen tower, was a regional landmark until its demolition in 2004.

The city is heavily indebted and in the process of cutting city services in order to balance its budget.

The city has capitalized on the export of a wide variety of breads, most notably Hagenschmagenbrot, a traditional dark bread.

Education

One of the five branches of South Westphalia University of Applied Sciences is located in the city (also: Fachhochschule Südwestfalen (FH SWF)), which offers various engineering programmes. This institution was founded in the city in 1824.

Attractions
Hagen is home to the LWL-Freilichtmuseum Hagen, or Hagen Westphalian Open-Air Museum, a collection of historic industrial facilities. Trades such as printing, brewing, smithing, milling, and many others are represented, not only with static displays, but as living, working operations that visitors may in some cases participate in. It is located near the Hagen community of Eilpe.

The Historisches Centrum Hagen includes the city museum and Werdringen castle. In the Blätterhöhle cave in Hagen, the oldest fossils of modern people in Westphalia and the Ruhr were found. Some date to the early Mesolithic, 10,700 years B.C.E. It seems that the descendants of Mesolithic people in this area maintained a foraging lifestyle for more than 2000 years after the arrival of farming societies.

Boroughs

some localities of Hagen:
Hagen-Dahl
Hagen-Emst
Hagen-Priorei
Hagen-Rummenohl
Hagen-Halden

Demographics
The following table shows the largest foreign resident groups in the city of Hagen.

Politics

Bundestag 
Part of the Hagen – Ennepe-Ruhr-Kreis I constituency for elections to the Bundestag

Mayor
The current Mayor of Hagen is independent Erik O. Schulz, elected in 2014 and re-elected in 2020. The most recent mayoral election was held on 13 September 2020, and the results were as follows:

! colspan=2| Candidate
! Party
! Votes
! %
|-
| bgcolor=| 
| align=left| Erik O. Schulz
| align=left| Independent (CDU/Green/FDP)
| 31,086
| 51.1
|-
| bgcolor=| 
| align=left| Wolfgang Jörg
| align=left| Social Democratic Party
| 15,547
| 25.5
|-
| 
| align=left| Josef Bücker
| align=left| Hagen Active
| 5,214
| 8.6
|-
| bgcolor=| 
| align=left| Michael Eiche
| align=left| Alternative for Germany
| 5,197
| 8.5
|-
| bgcolor=| 
| align=left| Laura Knüppel
| align=left| Die PARTEI
| 1,704
| 2.8
|-
| bgcolor=| 
| align=left| Ingo Hentschel
| align=left| The Left
| 1,534
| 2.5
|-
| bgcolor=| 
| align=left| Thorsten Kiszkenow
| align=left| Pirate Party Germany
| 420
| 0.7
|-
| bgcolor=| 
| align=left| Franco Flebus
| align=left| The Republicans
| 182
| 0.3
|-
! colspan=3| Valid votes
! 60,884
! 98.1
|-
! colspan=3| Invalid votes
! 1,156
! 1.9
|-
! colspan=3| Total
! 62,040
! 100.0
|-
! colspan=3| Electorate/voter turnout
! 147,361
! 42.1
|-
| colspan=7| Source: State Returning Officer
|}

The following is a list of mayors since 1946:
 1946–1956: Fritz Steinhoff (SPD)
 1956–1963: Helmut Turck (SPD)
 1963–1964: Fritz Steinhoff (SPD)
 1964–1971: Lothar Wrede (SPD)
 1971–1989: Rudolf Loskand (SPD)
 1989:      Renate Löchter (SPD)
 1989–1999: Dietmar Thieser (SPD)
 1999–2004: Wilfried Horn (CDU)
 2004–2009: Peter Demnitz (SPD)
 2009–2014: Jörg Dehm (CDU)
 since 2014: Erik O. Schulz (independent)

City council

The Hagen city council governs the city alongside the Mayor. The most recent city council election was held on 13 September 2020, and the results were as follows:

! colspan=2| Party
! Votes
! %
! +/-
! Seats
! +/-
|-
| bgcolor=| 
| align=left| Christian Democratic Union (CDU)
| 16,813
| 27.5
|  4.5
| 14
|  6
|-
| bgcolor=| 
| align=left| Social Democratic Party (SPD)
| 15,573
| 25.5
|  7.3
| 13
|  8
|-
| bgcolor=| 
| align=left| Alliance 90/The Greens (Grüne)
| 8,114
| 13.3
|  4.3
| 7
|  1
|-
| bgcolor=| 
| align=left| Alternative for Germany (AfD)
| 5,692
| 9.3
|  5.6
| 5
|  3
|-
| 
| align=left| Hagen Active (HA)
| 4,186
| 6.8
|  1.3
| 4
|  1
|-
| bgcolor=| 
| align=left| Free Democratic Party (FDP)
| 2,829
| 4.6
|  1.0
| 2
| ±0
|-
| 
| align=left| Citizens for Hohenlimburg (BfHo)
| 2,066
| 3.4
|  1.1
| 2
|  1
|-
| bgcolor=| 
| align=left| The Left (Die Linke)
| 1,762
| 2.9
|  1.4
| 2
|  1
|-
| 
| align=left| Hagen Activist Circle (HAK)
| 1,740
| 2.8
| New
| 2
| New
|-
| bgcolor=| 
| align=left| Die PARTEI (PARTEI)
| 1,692
| 2.8
| New
| 1
| New
|-
| colspan=7 bgcolor=lightgrey| 
|-
| bgcolor=| 
| align=left| Pirate Party Germany (Piraten)
| 436
| 0.7
|  0.9
| 0
|  1
|-
| bgcolor=| 
| align=left| The Republicans (REP)
| 194
| 0.3
| New
| 0
| New
|-
| bgcolor=| 
| align=left| Independents
| 19
| 0.0
| –
| 0
| –
|-
! colspan=2| Valid votes
! 61,116
! 98.7
! 
! 
! 
|-
! colspan=2| Invalid votes
! 825
! 1.3
! 
! 
! 
|-
! colspan=2| Total
! 61,941
! 100.0
! 
! 52
!  10
|-
! colspan=2| Electorate/voter turnout
! 147,361
! 42.0
!  3.1
! 
! 
|-
| colspan=7| Source: State Returning Officer
|}

Transport

The Autobahnen A1, A45 and A46 pass by Hagen.

Hagen has been an important rail junction for the southeastern Ruhr valley since the first rail line opened in 1848. The marshalling yard of Hagen-Vorhalle is among Germany's largest, and the central station offers connections to the ICE network of Deutsche Bahn as well as to local and S-Bahn services. Since December 2005, Hagen has also been the starting point for a service into Essen, the Ruhr-Lenne-Express, operated by Abellio Deutschland. Since 2022, it has been operated by DB Regio.

Local traffic is handled by Hagener Straßenbahn (Hagen Tramways), which, despite its name, offers only bus services, as the last tramway route in Hagen was abandoned in May 1976. All in all there is a large-scale network of 36 bus lines in Hagen. All local rail and bus services operate under the transport association VRR.

Sport
The German Basketball Federation (DBB) is based in Hagen.

Sport clubs in Hagen:
 TSV Hagen 1860 - largest club (multiple fistball champions)
 SSV Hagen (1974 basketball champions), later known as Brandt Hagen
 Phoenix Hagen, Basketball Bundesliga - ENERVIE Arena im Sportpark Ischeland
 Hasper SV
 Hohenlimburger SV (multiple women water polo champions)

Hagen is also famous of its annual equestrian show 'Horses & Dreams' in April at Hof Kasselmann. It is one of the greatest equestrian shows in Germany and abroad.  In 2005 they were the host of the European Dressage Championships after Moscow withdrew. In 2021 Hagen is again host of the 2021 European Dressage Championships for seniors and U25.

Twin towns – sister cities

Hagen is twinned with:
 Liévin, France (1960)
 Montluçon, France (1965)
 Steglitz-Zehlendorf (Berlin), Germany (1967)
 Bruck an der Mur, Austria (1974)
 Smolensk, Russia (1985)
 Modi'in-Maccabim-Re'ut, Israel (1997)

Notable people

Friedrich Harkort (1793–1880), railway and industrial pioneer and politician (German Progressive Party)
 Georg von Vincke (1811–1875), politician
 Karl Halle (1819–1895), also known as Sir Charles Hallé, pianist, composer and orchestra conductor
 Eugen Richter (1838–1906), politician (German Progressive Party)
 Wilhelm Böing (born 1846), father of William Boeing, founder of the Boeing aviation company
 Hugo Siepmann (1868-1950), industrialist
 Karl Ernst Osthaus (1874–1921), banker and patron of avant-garde art and architecture
 Will Lammert (1892–1957), sculptor
 Hansheinrich Dransmann (1894–1964), conductor, composer
 Franz Bronstert (1895–1967), painter
 Fritz Steinhoff (1897–1969), politician (SPD)
 Heinrich Brocksieper (1898–1968), painter and photographer, experimental filmmaker and former Bauhaus student
 Hans Nieland (1900–1976), politician (NSDAP)
 Burkhart Waldecker (1902–1964), explorer
 Hugo Paul (1905–1962), politician (KPD)
 Ernst Meister (1911–1979), lyricist, radio playwright, narrator and theater author
 Emil Schumacher (1912–1999), painter (abstract art)
 Artur Axmann (1913–1996), politician (NSDAP) and Reichsjugendführer
 Erwin Milzkott (1913–1986), violinist
 Herbert Reinecker (1914–2007), writer and screenwriter
 Liselotte Funcke (1918–2012), liberal politician, vice president of federal parliament, state Minister of Economy in North Rhine-Westphalia, Federal Commissioner for Foreigners
 Nicholas Rescher (born 1928), American philosopher
 Rotraut Wisskirchen (1936–2018), Biblical archaeologist
 Freddy Breck (1942–2008), percussionist
 Jürgen Schläder (born 1948), musicologist
 Hans Reichel (1949–2011), guitarist, violinist, instrument maker and typographer
 Annette Humpe (born 1950) music producer, singer of the bands Ideal and Ich + Ich
 Nena (Gabriele Susanne Kerner) (born 1960), pop singer
 Antje Vowinckel (born 1964), sound artist, radio artist and musician.
 Mousse T. (Mustafa Gündogdu) (born 1966), DJ, musician, remixer and producer
 Mambo Kurt (Rainer Limpinsel) (born 1967), musician and solo entertainer
 Barbara Morgenstern (born 1971), musician
  (born 1971), politician (SPD), mayor of Gevelsberg
 Henning Wehn (born 1974), comedian
 Jan-Ole Gerster (born 1978), film director and screenwriter
 Bettina Hauert (born 1982), professional golfer
 René Eidams (born 1989), darts player

See also
 Accumulatoren-Fabrik AFA
 Wippermann jr GmbH

References

External links

 

 
Cities in North Rhine-Westphalia
Members of the Hanseatic League